(Serenade No. 13 for strings in G major), K. 525, is a 1787 composition for a chamber ensemble by Wolfgang Amadeus Mozart (1756–1791). The German title means "a little night music". The work is written for an ensemble of two violins, viola, cello and double bass, but is often performed by string orchestras. The serenade is one of Mozart's most famous works.

Composition, publication, and reception

The serenade was completed in Vienna on 10 August 1787, around the time Mozart was working on the second act of his opera Don Giovanni. It is not known why it was composed. Wolfgang Hildesheimer, noting that most of Mozart's serenades were written on commission, suggests that this serenade, too, was a commission, whose origin and first performance were not recorded.

The traditionally used name of the work comes from the entry Mozart made for it in his personal catalog, which begins, "Eine kleine Nacht-Musik". As Zaslaw and Cowdery point out, Mozart almost certainly was not giving the piece a special title, but only entering in his records that he had completed a little serenade.

The work was not published until about 1827, long after Mozart's death, by Johann André in Offenbach am Main. It had been sold to this publisher in 1799 by Mozart's widow Constanze, part of a large bundle of her husband's compositions.

Today, the serenade is widely performed and recorded; indeed, both Jacobson and Hildesheimer opine that the serenade is the most popular of all Mozart's works. Of the music, Hildesheimer writes, "even if we hear it on every street corner, its high quality is undisputed, an occasional piece from a light but happy pen."

Movements
The work has four movements:

I. Allegro

This first movement is in sonata-allegro form. It opens with an ascending Mannheim rocket theme. The second theme is more graceful and in D major, the dominant key of G major. The exposition closes in D major and is repeated. The development section begins on D major and touches on D minor and C major before the work returns to G major for the recapitulation.

The first theme

II. Romanze: Andante

The second movement, with the tempo marked Andante, is a Romanze in the subdominant key of C major. It is in rondo form, taking the shape A–B–A–C–A plus a final coda. The keys of the sections are C major for A and B, C minor for C. The middle appearance of A is truncated, consisting of only the first half of the theme. Daniel Heartz describes the movement as evoking gavotte rhythm: each of its sections begins in the middle of the measure, with a double upbeat.

III. Menuetto: Allegretto
The third movement, marked Allegretto, is a minuet and trio, both in  time. The minuet is in the home key of G major, the contrasting trio in the dominant key of D major. As is normal in this form, the minuet is played again da capo following the trio.

IV. Rondo: Allegro

The fourth and last movement is in lively tempo, marked Allegro; the key is again G major and the thematic material is presented in the order A–B–A–B–A and concludes with a long coda based on the A theme. The movement is written in sonata-rondo form. Mozart specifies repeats not just for the exposition section but also for the following development and recapitulation section. The recapitulation's first theme is unusual because only its last two bars return in the parallel minor. This is followed by the coda which ends the piece.

Possible extra movement
In the catalog entry mentioned above, Mozart listed the work as having five movements ("Allegro – Minuet and Trio – Romance – Minuet and Trio – Finale."). The second movement in his listing — a minuet and trio — was long thought lost, and no one knows if Mozart or someone else removed it. In his 1984 recording, Christopher Hogwood used a minuet of Thomas Attwood (found in his sketchbooks used while he took lessons from Mozart), and an additional newly composed trio to substitute the missing movement. Musicologist Alfred Einstein suggested, however, that a minuet in the Piano Sonata in B major, K. 498a, is the missing movement. K. 498a, which is credited to the composer August Eberhard Müller, incorporates significant amounts of Mozart's work in the form of reworkings of material from the piano concertos K. 450, K. 456, and K. 595, leading Einstein to suggest that the minuet in Müller's sonata might be an arrangement of the missing movement from Eine kleine Nachtmusik.

In 1971, this movement was incorporated into a recording of the work prepared by the musicologist and performer Thurston Dart. In 1989, the minuet and trio of K. 498a was again recorded as part of an arrangement of Eine Kleine Nachtmusik made by Jonathan Del Mar for Nimbus Records.

See also
 Parodies by Peter Schickele:
 Eine kleine Nichtmusik
 A Little Nightmare Music

Notes and references
Notes

References

Sources

External links

 
 
 Performance of Eine kleine Nachtmusik by A Far Cry from the Isabella Stewart Gardner Museum in MP3 format

1787 compositions
Compositions by Wolfgang Amadeus Mozart published posthumously
Compositions in G major
Serenade 13